Austin Reed (born February 22, 2000) is an American football quarterback for the Western Kentucky Hilltoppers.

Early life
Austin Reed grew up in St. Augustine Beach, Florida, and attended St. Augustine High School.

College career

Southern Illinois 
Reed began his college football career at Southern Illinois.

West Florida 
Reed transferred to West Florida in the Summer of 2019. He led the 2019 West Florida Argonauts football team to  the NCAA Division II national championship. During the national championship season he totaled 4,084 passing yards with 40 touchdowns  and 11 interceptions.

In July 2021, Reed signed the first Name, Image and Likeness (NIL) sponsorship in West Florida history, striking a deal with the Running Wild chain of running stores.

Western Kentucky 
After the 2021 season, he entered the NCAA transfer portal and committed in March 2022 to Western Kentucky. He was selected as the team's starting quarterback during summer camp in August 2022.

In his first game at Western Kentucky, he threw four touchdown passes in a 38–28 victory over Austin Peay. Through games played on November 19, he ranked second in the nation with 3,837 passing yards.

Statistics

References

External links
Western Kentucky Hilltoppers bio
West Florida Argonauts bio
Southern Illinois Salukis bio

2000 births
Living people
People from St. Augustine, Florida
Players of American football from Florida
American football quarterbacks
Southern Illinois Salukis football players
West Florida Argonauts football players
Western Kentucky Hilltoppers football players